The 1996–97 Toto Cup Leumit was the 13th season of the third most important football tournament in Israel since its introduction.

It was held in two stages. First, the 16 Liga Leumit teams were divided into four groups. The group winners advanced to the semi-finals, which, as was the final, were held as one-legged matches.

The competition was won by Bnei Yehuda, who had beaten Hapoel Haifa 3–0 in the final.

Group stage

Group A

Group B

Group C

Group D

Elimination rounds

Semifinals

Final

See also
 1996–97 Toto Cup Artzit

Leumit
Toto Cup Leumit
Toto Cup Leumit